Clark Murdock (born  1940s) is a senior adviser at Center for Strategic and International Studies (CSIS), a Washington, D.C.-based foreign policy think tank.  Murdock specializes in strategic planning, defense policy, and national security affairs.  He also serves as the Director of the Project on Nuclear Issues, a collection of nuclear experts from government, academia, the national laboratories, the military, and the private sector.

In 2000, Murdock taught military strategy, the national security process, and military innovation at the National War College. From 1995 to 2000, he was deputy director of the headquarters planning function for the United States Air Force. As deputy special assistant to the chief for long-range planning, he helped define a coherent strategic vision for the 2020 Air Force and institutionalize a new long-range planning process. As deputy director for strategic planning, he helped implement the new planning process and led the development of several new planning products. Before joining the Air Force, he headed the Policy Planning Staff in the Office of the Under Secretary of Defense for Policy.

Murdock has served in many roles in the defense world, including as a senior policy adviser to House Armed Services Committee chairman Les Aspin, as an analyst and Africa issues manager in the CIA, and in the Office of the Secretary of Defense. He also taught for 10 years at the State University of New York at Buffalo. He is an honors graduate of Swarthmore College and holds a Ph.D. in political science from the University of Wisconsin–Madison.

Education
 BA Political Science from Swarthmore College (with honors)
 Ph.D. in Political Science (with a minor in economics) from the University of Wisconsin–Madison

Publications
 Transitioning Defense Organizational Initiatives: An Assessment of Key 2001-2008 Defense Reforms, CSIS Publication, 11/12/2008
 Facilitating a Dialogue among Senior-Level DoD Officials on National Security Priorities, CSIS Publication, 04/04/2008
 The Department of Defense and the Nuclear Mission in the 21st Century, CSIS Publication, 03/05/2008
 U.S. Air Force Bomber Modernization Plans: An Independent Assessment, CSIS Publication, 01/25/2008
 Special Operations Forces Aviation, CSIS Publication, 10/26/2007
 Future Making: Getting Your Organization Ready for What’s Next, Murdock Associates, Inc., 09/01/2007
 Debating 21st Century Nuclear Issues, CSIS Publication, 07/24/2007
 Beyond Goldwater-Nichols: An Annotated Brief, CSIS Publication, 08/01/2006
 The Future of the National Guard and Reserves, CSIS Publication, 07/12/2006
 Beyond Goldwater-Nichols: Phase 3 Report, CSIS Publication, 07/01/2006
 Defense Acquisition Performance Assessment Panel Final Report, CSIS Publication, 01/27/2006
 Beyond Goldwater-Nichols: Phase 2 Report, CSIS Publication, 07/28/2005
 Beyond Goldwater-Nichols: Phase 1 Report, CSIS Publication, 03/01/2004
 Improving the Practice of National Security Strategy, CSIS Publication, 02/01/2004
 Conduct of the Military Campaign Against Iraq, CSIS Publication, 03/06/2003
 Revitalizing the U.S. Nuclear Deterrent, CSIS Publication, 2002

References

External links
 CSIS Expert Profiles: Clark A. Murdock
 
 

Year of birth missing (living people)
1940s births
Living people
Swarthmore College alumni
University of Wisconsin–Madison College of Letters and Science alumni
American foreign policy writers
American male non-fiction writers
American political scientists